Maura is a female given name primarily used in English, Spanish, Italian, Greek, Scots Gaelic, and Irish. It appears as the feminine form of the Roman given name Maurus and as an Anglicisation of Máire, the Irish form of Mary.

In the U.S., this name peaked in popularity in 1964 as the 469th most popular name for girls born that year, and remained in the top 1000 names until 2007.

People with first name Maura
Saint Maura of Egypt, a martyred companion of Timothy the Reader during the Diocletian Persecution
Saint Maura of Ireland, a martyred companion of Britta
Saint Maura of Troyes, a noble French virgin
Maura Clarke, American nun and missionary
Maura D. Corrigan, justice of the Michigan Supreme Court
Maura Davis, American musician
Maura Hagan, American physicist
Maura Hanrahan, Canadian author
Maura Harty, United States Assistant Secretary of State for the Bureau of Consular Affairs
Maura Healey, Governor of Massachusetts 
Maura Johnston, American music critic and blogger
Maura Kennedy, musician in American folk-rock duo The Kennedys
Maura Latty, American artist
Maura Mast, Irish-American mathematician
Maura McNiel (1921–2020), American feminist activist
Maura Murphy, Irish author
Maura Murray, college student who went missing Feb. 9, 2004
Maura O'Connell, Irish singer
Maura Tierney (born 1965), American film and television actress
Maura Tombelli, Italian astronomer
Maura Viceconte, Italian long-distance runner 
Maura West (born 1972), American actress

Fiction
Maura Glee, fictional character in the webcomic Diesel Sweeties
Maura Isles, a main character of Rizzoli & Isles and the novels by Tess Gerritsen on which the series is based.
Maura Labingi or Frodo Baggins, a character in The Lord of the Rings
Maura Pfefferman, née Mort Pfefferman – Jeffrey Tambor's character on Transparent. 
Maura Ellis, Amy Poehler's character in the 2015 film Sisters.
Maura Sargent, a character in the Raven Cycle series by Maggie Stiefvater

See also
 Santa or St Maura, a former name of the Greek island of Lefkada

References

Latin feminine given names
Irish feminine given names
Italian feminine given names
Spanish feminine given names
Scottish feminine given names
English feminine given names